The 2006 Australian Saloon Car Championship was open to drivers of Saloon Cars complying with CAMS Group 3K regulations. The title was contested over a seven round series with three races per round.
 Round 1, Wakefield Park Raceway, New South Wales, 5 March
 Round 2, Symmons Plains International Raceway, Tasmania, 8 & 9 April
 Round 3, Oran Park Raceway, New South Wales, 6 & 7 May
 Round 4, Mallala Motorsport Park, South Australia, 25 June
 Round 5, Phillip Island Grand Prix Circuit, Victoria, 19 & 20 August
 Round 6, Oran Park Raceway, New South Wales, 28 & 29 October
 Round 7, Eastern Creek International Raceway, New South Wales, 25 & 26 November

Points were awarded based on the results of each race as follows
 1st, 40 points
 2nd, 35 points
 3rd, 31 points
 4th, 27 points
 5th, 23 points
 6th, 20 points
 7th, 17 points
 8th, 15 points
 9th, 13 points
 10th, 11 points
 11th, 10 points
 12th, 9 points
 13th, 8 points
 14th, 7 points
 15th, 6 points
 16th, 5 points
 17th, 4 points
 18th, 3 points
 19th, 2 points
 20th to 40th, 1 point

The results of this, the first Australian Saloon Car Championship, are given below.

Note : The Paul Fiore listed in 6th position and the Paul Fiore listed in 26th position are undoubtedly the same driver. This duplication appears in the results published at www.tascco.com.au and also those published in The Annual.

References
 The Annual - Australian Motorsport, Number 2 / 2006
 http://www.cams.com.au/ (Archived 2009-05-16)
 http://www.camsmanual.com.au/ (Archived 2009-05-07)
 http://www.natsoft.com.au/
 https://web.archive.org/web/20090301212955/http://www.tascco.com.au/

Saloon Car Championship
Saloon Cars